Theretra gala is a moth of the  family Sphingidae. It is known from Indonesia.

References

Theretra
Moths described in 1999